The 1997 Wake Forest Demon Deacons football team was an American football team that represented Wake Forest University during the 1997 NCAA Division I-A football season. In their fifth season under head coach Jim Caldwell, the Demon Deacons compiled a 5–6 record and finished in a tie for sixth place in the Atlantic Coast Conference.

Schedule

Team leaders

References

Wake Forest
Wake Forest Demon Deacons football seasons
Wake Forest Demon Deacons football